Magnetic storm can refer to:

 A geomagnetic storm
 Magnetic Storm, a 1984 book by Roger Dean
 "Magnetic Storm", an episode of Nova documentary TV series, 2003

See also
 Geo storm (disambiguation)
 Solar storm